At least two ships of the French Navy have been named Austerlitz:

  an  launched in 1808 and broken up in 1837
  a  launched in 1852 and broken up in 1895

French Navy ship names